Singiya(VDC) has been replaced by municipality in Sunsari District in the Kosi Zone of south-eastern Nepal. At the time of the 1991 Nepal census it had a population of 82843 people living in 1632 individual households.

References 

Populated places in Sunsari District